Agatha and the Midnight Murders is a 2020 British alternative history television drama film about crime writer Agatha Christie. The film premiered on Channel 5 in the United Kingdom on 5 October 2020, and on PBS in the United States 25 May 2021. It was directed by Joe Stephenson.

Plot
Christie is having trouble collecting the American royalties on her published works. In a bid to make a private cash sale of a manuscript, therefore, she decides to kill off her most famous character, Hercule Poirot. She hires a low-life man to accompany her as a bodyguard for a cut of the price. The action takes place in a hotel where Christie expects to complete the transaction. Christie and her bodyguard encounter the prospective buyers and a varied group of hotel guests. The suspense builds as a series of murders takes place in the hotel.

Cast
 Helen Baxendale as Agatha Christie
 Blake Harrison as Travis Pickford
 Jacqueline Boatswain as Audrey Evans
 Gina Bramhill as Grace Nicory
 Daniel Caltagirone as Eli Schneider
 Thomas Chaanhing as Frankie Lei
 Scott Chambers as Clarence Allen
 Vanessa Grasse as Nell Lewis
 Jodie McNee as PC O'Hanauer
 Elizabeth Tan as Jun Yuhuan
 Morgan Watkins as Rocco Vella
 Alistair Petrie as Sir Malcolm Campbell

Production
Filming took place in Malta, back-to-back with Agatha and the Curse of Ishtar.

Reception
The show was poorly received by critics. Writing in The Guardian, Euan Ferguson said: "It was a mess: ill-plotted, playing bits for laughs or for horror without ever achieving either." Anita Singh of The Daily Telegraph gave the show 2 out of 5 stars, writing: "All of the characters' behavior felt a little weird, and it was not clear if that was by accident or design. Some were caricatures while others were barely there."

References

External links
 
  Agatha and the Midnight Murders at Darlow Smithson Productions

Cultural depictions of Agatha Christie
2020 television films
Biographical films about writers
2020 films
2020s British films
British drama television films